Rabdophaga rosacea is a species of gall midge that creates rosette galls on roses found in the central plains of North America.

The species was first described in 1908 by Ephraim Porter Felt from a collection made by Norman Criddle in Aweme, Manitoba, Canada. The holotype, an adult male, is in the collection of the New York State Museum.

Description
The midge causes galls to form on the terminal buds of native roses (Rosa spp.) The galls are tightly packed leafy rosettes with a central cavity.

Etymology
The genus name 'Rabdophaga' is formed from two Greek roots; rhabdos- meaning a rod or staff and -phaga meaning 'eater' In older references the genus name is spelled 'Rhabdophaga'.
The specific name 'rosacea' refers to the genus of plants that are the hosts of the midge.

Taxonomy
As gall midges are one of the most diverse yet least known group of the true flies, a taxonomic revision of the world fauna of this group is in process. In 2014, it was proposed that Rhadophaga rosacea be placed in Dasineura, a broadly defined polyphyletic genus of gall midges, as Dasineura rosacea. Both Radophaga and Dasineura are within the Tribe Dasineurini, a group of plant feeders that share several physical similarities.

References

Gall-inducing insects
Insects described in 1908
Taxa named by Ephraim Porter Felt
rosacea
Diptera of North America